Cardiopharynx schoutedeni is a species of cichlid endemic to Lake Tanganyika in East Africa. It is found in Burundi, the Democratic Republic of the Congo, Tanzania, and Zambia. This semi-pelagic fish prefers habitats over sandy bottoms where it feeds on aquatic microorganisms.  It can reach a length of  TL.  It is also found in the aquarium trade. The specific name honours the Belgian zoologist Henri Schouteden (1881-1972) who was director of Musée Royal de l’Afrique Centrale in Tervuren and who was one of the first zoologists to collect this species.

References

Ectodini
Fish described in 1942
Taxa named by Max Poll
Taxonomy articles created by Polbot